James R. Larus (born September 15, 1958) is a computer scientist specializing in the fields of programming languages, compilers, and computer architecture. He is currently at École Polytechnique Fédérale de Lausanne (EPFL) where he has served as the Dean of the School of Computer and Communication Sciences (IC) from 2014 until 2021.

Before joining EPFL, Larus worked as a Principal Researcher in Microsoft Research, where he worked from 1998 until 2013. He was at one point the Director of Research and Strategy for Microsoft's eXtreme Computing Group (XCG) where he helped develop the Orleans cloud computing project. He was also one of the two co-leads on Microsoft's Singularity project.

Prior to working for Microsoft, James was an associate professor at University of Wisconsin–Madison in the Computer Science department.

Education
Larus graduated magna cum laude from Harvard University in 1980 with an A.B. in Applied Mathematics. He got both a Masters and a PhD in Computer Science from University of California, Berkeley in 1982 and 1989 respectively.

Publications and Notable Work
Larus is known for the creation of SPIM, a widely distributed MIPS simulator.

He has written many papers and has an h-index of 67. One of his best known papers is his paper on efficient path profiling.

He is also a co-author of the book 'Transactional Memory', published in 2007 by Morgan Claypool.

Larus also helped fund and lead the development of the Decentralized Privacy-Preserving Proximity Tracing (DP-3T) effort to provide contact tracing as a way to slow the COVID-19 pandemic.

Achievements
Larus was a Harvard College Scholar, a National Science Foundation Young Investigator, and is an ACM Fellow. He has also won numerous awards for his papers over the years.

References

1958 births
Living people
Harvard University alumni
University of California, Berkeley alumni
University of Wisconsin–Madison faculty
Academic staff of the École Polytechnique Fédérale de Lausanne